A land patent is a form of letters patent assigning official ownership of a particular tract of land that has gone through various legally-prescribed processes like surveying and documentation, followed by the letter's signing, sealing, and publishing in public records, made by a sovereign entity. 

It is the highest evidence of right, title, and interest to a defined area. It is usually granted by a central, federal, or state government to an individual, partnership, trust, or private company.

The land patent is not to be confused with a land grant. Patented lands may be lands that had been granted by a sovereign authority in return for services rendered or accompanying a title or otherwise bestowed gratis, or they may be lands privately purchased by a government, individual, or legal entity from their prior owners.

"Patent" is both a process and a term. As a process, it is somewhat parallel to gaining a patent for intellectual property, including the steps of uniquely defining the property at issue, filing, processing, and granting.  Unlike intellectual property patents, which have time limits, a land patent is permanent.

In the United States, all claims of land ownership can be traced back to a land patent, first-title deed, or similar document regarding land originally owned by France, Spain, the United Kingdom, Mexico, the Kingdom of Hawaii, Russia, or Native Americans. Other terms for the certificate that grants such rights include "first-title deed" and '"final certificate."

A land patent is known in law as "letters patent" and usually issues to the original grantee and to their heirs and assigns forever. The patent stands as supreme title to the land because it attests that all evidence of title existent before its issue date had been reviewed by the sovereign authority under which it was sealed and was so sealed as irrefutable. Thus, the land patent itself so becomes at law the title to the land defined within its four corners.

In practice, the irrefutability of counter-claims is relative, but once a patent is granted, permanence of title is established.

History of US land patents
Land in the United States of America was acquired by claim, seizure, annexation, purchase, treaty, or war from  France, Great Britain, the Kingdom of Hawaii, Mexico, Russia, Spain, and the Native American peoples.

As England, later to become Great Britain, began to colonize America, the Crown made large grants of territory to individuals and companies. In turn, the companies and colonial governors later made smaller grants of land based on actual surveys of the land. Thus, in colonial America on the Atlantic seaboard, a connection was made between the surveying of a land tract and its "patenting" as private property.

Many original colonies' land patents came from the corresponding country of control like Great Britain. Most such patents were permanently granted. Those patents are still in force; the US government honors those patents by treaty law, and, as with all such land patents, they cannot be changed.

Many early patents of lands originally granted by Native peoples were contested, occasionally in court, as a result of different understandings of "private property" and "ownership" between those people, who typically held land and its bounties communally, reinforced by oral tradition, and colonizers from Western Europe who held established and finite views on assets, their transfer, and their adjudication in a system of written laws, Crown rights and officials, courts, and permanent records.

After the American Revolution and the ratification of the US Constitution, the US Treasury Department was placed in charge of managing all public lands. In 1812, the General Land Office was created to assume that duty.

In accord with specific Acts of Congress and under the hand and seal of the US President, the General Land Office issued more than 2 million land grants made patent (land patents), passing the title of specific parcels of public land from the nation to private parties (individuals or private companies). Some of the land so granted had survey or other costs associated with it. Some patentees paid those fees for their land in cash, others homesteaded a claim, and still others came into ownership via one of the many donation acts that Congress passed to transfer public lands to private ownership. Whatever the method, the General Land Office followed a two-step procedure in granting a patent.

Firstly, the private claimant went to the land office in the land district in which the public land was located. The claimant filled out entry papers to select the public land, and the land office register (clerk) checked the local registrar records to make sure the claimed land was still available. The receiver (bursar) took the claimant's payment, because even homesteaders had to pay administrative fees.

Then, the district land office register and receiver sent the paperwork to the General Land Office in Washington. That office double-checked the accuracy of the claim, its availability and the form of payment. Finally, the General Land Office issued a land patent for the claimed public land and sent it on to the President for his signature.

The first US land patent was issued on March 4, 1788, to John Martin. That patent reserves to the United States one third of all gold, silver, lead and copper within the claimed land.

Usage restrictions (such as oil and mineral rights, roadways, ditches, and canals) placed on the land are spelled out in the patent and are distinct from state and local statutory regulations relative to property appurtenant to the land, such as zoning and building codes, as well as property taxes applying to both land and property.

Private property rights accompanying land patents can also be thereafter negotiated in accord with the terms of private contracts. The rights inherent in patented land are carried from heir to heir, heir to assignee, or assignee to assignee and cannot be changed except by private contract (warranty deed, quitclaim deed, etc.). In most cases, the law of a particular piece of patented land will be governed by the Congressional Act or treaty under which it was acquired, or by terms spelled out in the patent. For example, US laws govern the land may involve the Homestead Act or reservations placed on the face of the patent, and the Treaty of Guadalupe Hidalgo governs certain jurisdictional dicta relating to large amounts of land in California and adjoining territories.

Legal entities other than natural persons (such as trusts and corporations) may not obtain land patents except by express act of the US Congress. An example of Congress granting land through patents to corporate entities is the railroad grants made under the Pacific Railroad Acts to compensate the railroad companies for building a transnational railroad across America.

Former US territories
When a territory agreed to enter the United States, an Enabling Act was agreed to as a condition precedent of statehood. The Enabling Act requires that all unappropriated lands, which are not yet privately owned, to be forever disclaimed by the territory and the people of the territory and the title to ceded to the United States for its disposition. For example, the enabling act of the Washington Territory declares in part:

...that the people inhabiting said proposed States do agree and declare that they forever disclaim all right and title to the unappropriated public lands lying within the boundaries thereof, and to all lands lying within said limits owned or held by any Indian or Indian tribes; and that until the title thereto shall have been extinguished by the United States, the same shall be and remain subject to the disposition of the United States. ..

After the right and title to land was disclaimed by the people of the territory, it was held in trust by the United States until someone proved a claim to it, typically by improving the homestead parcel for a certain period of time. Once a proper claim has been filed, the General Land Office (now the Bureau of Land Management) certifies that the claimant has paid for a survey, as well as depositing another sum of money. Then, pursuant to the various land acts of Congress, the land is granted to the private owner by letters patent under the signature and seal of the US President.

References

External links
 Land Patent information available from Bureau of Land Management
 Land Patent background information at U.S. government archives
 Land Patent supplemental information at 
 Detailed information about Texas' retention of its public lands upon statehood and the history of Texas' public lands and land grants available in a Texas General Land Office pdf publication at http://www.glo.texas.gov/history/archives/forms/files/history-of-texas-public-lands.pdf

Property law in the United States
Real property law